An encoder is a sensor which turns a position into an electronic signal.

There are two forms:
 Absolute encoders give an absolute position value.
 Incremental encoders count movement rather than position. With detection of a datum position and the use of a counter, an absolute position may be derived.

The position may be measured as either linear or angular position
 Linear encoder, converts linear position to an electronic signal
 Rotary encoder, converts rotary position to an electronic signal

See also 
 Encoder (disambiguation)